Japanese missions to Ming China represent a lens for examining and evaluating the relationships between China and Japan in the 15th through the 17th centuries. The nature of these bilateral contacts encompassed political and ceremonial acknowledgment as well as cultural exchanges. The evolution of diplomatic ties accompanied the growing commercial ties which grew over time.

Nineteen trade missions traveled from Japan to China between 1401 and 1547. The main trade goods exported from Japan were Japanese swords, copper, and sulfur; from China, copper coins, raw silk, and silk fabrics. Every one of these missions were headed by a Zen Buddhist monk from one of the so-called  or "five great Zen temples of Kyoto", consisting of Nanzen-ji, Tenryū-ji, Shokoku-ji, Kennin-ji, Tofuku-ji and Manju-ji.

Tally trade
The economic benefit of the Sinocentric tribute system was profitable trade. The tally trade (勘合貿易, kangō bōeki in Japanese and kanhe maoyi in Chinese) was a system devised and monitored by the Chinese.  The tally trade involved exchanges of Japanese products for Chinese goods.  The Chinese "tally" was a certificate issued by the Ming.  The first 100 such tallies were conveyed to Japan in 1404.  Only those with this formal proof of Imperial permission represented by the document were officially allowed to travel and trade within the boundaries of China; and only those diplomatic missions presenting authentic tallies were received as legitimate ambassadors.

Over time, the conditions of this mutually beneficial tally trade would evolve beyond its initial perimeters.

Selected missions

See also
 Sinocentrism
 Japanese missions to Sui China
 Japanese missions to Tang China
 Japanese missions to Joseon

Notes

References

 Fogel, Joshua A. (2009). Articulating the Sinosphere: Sino-Japanese Relations in Space and Time. Cambridge: Harvard University Press.  ; 
 Goodrich, Luther Carrington and Zhaoying Fang. (1976).  Dictionary of Ming biography, 1368-1644 (明代名人傳), Vol. I;  Dictionary of Ming biography, 1368-1644 (明代名人傳), Vol. II.  New York: Columbia University Press. ; ;  OCLC 1622199
 Mizuno, Norihito. (2003). China in Tokugawa Foreign Relations: The Tokugawa Bakufu’s Perception of and Attitudes toward Ming-Qing China, p. 109. excerpt from Japan and Its East Asian Neighbors: Japan's Perception of China and Korea and the Making of Foreign Policy from the Seventeenth to the Nineteenth Century, Ph.D. dissertation, Ohio State University, 2004, as cited in Tsutsui, William M. (2009).  A Companion to Japanese History, p. 83.
 Nussbaum, Louis Frédéric and Käthe Roth. (2005). Japan Encyclopedia. Cambridge: Harvard University Press. ; OCLC 48943301
  Titsingh, Isaac, ed. (1834). [Siyun-sai Rin-siyo/Hayashi Gahō, 1652], Nipon o daï itsi ran; ou,  Annales des empereurs du Japon.  Paris: Oriental Translation Fund of Great Britain and Ireland.  OCLC 300555357
 Verschuer, Charlotte von. (2006). Across the Perilous Sea : Japanese Trade with China and Korea from the Seventh to the Sixteenth Centuries (Commerce extérieur du Japon des origines au XVIe siècle) translated by Kristen Lee Hunter. Ithaca, New York: East Asia Program, Cornell University, 2006.   ; 
 Yoda, Yoshiie. (1996). The Foundations of Japan's Modernization: a comparison with China's Path towards Modernization. Leiden: Brill. ;  OCLC 246732011

Ambassadors of Japan to China
Foreign relations of the Ming dynasty